Corliss is an unincorporated community in Fayette County, West Virginia, United States.

References 

Unincorporated communities in West Virginia
Unincorporated communities in Fayette County, West Virginia